Ulrich II (c. 1254 – 18 September 1279) was Count of Württemberg from 1265 until 1279.

Ulrich was the son of Ulrich I and Mechthild of Baden. He acceded power in 1265, at the age of 11 and, thus, was most likely under the tutelage of Count Hartmann II of Grüningen. He is first mentioned in documents around 1270. It's unknown if Ulrich was married.

His half-brother Eberhard I succeeded him. His corpse rested in the church of Beutelsbach. In 1316 or 1320 his remains were moved to the Stiftskirche in Stuttgart.

References 

1250s births
1279 deaths
13th-century counts of Württemberg
Medieval child monarchs
Burials at Stiftskirche, Stuttgart